Abbotswood is a new 52-hectare building development planned to have 800 homes. It is located just to the north east of the town of Romsey in the Test Valley local government district.

History
The name 'Abbotswood' is derived from 'the abbess [of Romsey]’s wood'; it was recorded as Abbys wode in 1513 and Abbes wood in 1565.

New development
Outline permission for a new development comprising 800 homes on a site at Abbotswood was granted in 2010. Construction began in 2011 and by the end of 2017, 753 homes were occupied.

On 1 August 2014, planning permission was sought for a local centre consisting of a shop, pub, doctors/dentists surgery, pharmacy, community centre, and a day nursery. The planning application reference is 14/01836/RESS.

References

Villages in Hampshire
Romsey